Out of the Sun is the first studio album by guitarist Joey Tafolla, released in 1987 through Shrapnel Records. The album features fellow shred guitarists Paul Gilbert and Tony MacAlpine in various roles (guitar, keyboards and production).

Critical reception

Andy Hinds at AllMusic gave Out of the Sun 1.5 stars out of five, calling it "an undistinguished set of standard neoclassical shred instrumentals" and criticizing Tafolla for copying MacAlpine too much. He remarked that Tafolla "shows plenty of talent, but not much personality here. On this early effort, Taffola hasn't found his voice yet."

Track listing

Personnel
Musicians
Joey Tafolla – guitar
Paul Gilbert – additional guitar solos (tracks 3, 5, 6, 9)
Tony MacAlpine – keyboards, additional melodies, producer
Reynold Carlson – drums, cymbals
Wally Voss – bass

Production
Steve Fontano – engineer
Dino Alden – assistant engineer
George Horn – mastering at Fantasy Studios, Berkeley, California
Mike Varney – executive producer

References

External links
In Review: Joey Tafolla "Out Of The Sun" at Guitar Nine Records

Joey Tafolla albums
1987 debut albums
Shrapnel Records albums
Albums produced by Mike Varney